Born for Hell (German: Die Hinrichtung,  "The Execution"; also released as Naked Massacre) is a 1976 horror film directed by Denis Héroux, and starring Mathieu Carrière, Debra Berger, and Christine Boisson. Its plot follows a disturbed American Vietnam War veteran who, after arriving in Belfast, terrorizes a house full of international female nursing students. The film is set against the historical backdrops of the Northern Ireland conflict and the December Raids in North Vietnam. The screenplay is loosely based on the crimes of serial killer Richard Speck, who murdered eight nursing students in Chicago, Illinois in 1966.

Plot 
In late 1972 Belfast, during the early stages of the Northern Ireland conflict, a disturbed American soldier, Cain Adams, has arrived after having deserted in the Vietnam War. Though eager to return to the United States, Cain is unable to board a ship from Belfast for approximately one week. While meandering around the city, Cain eventually meets a middle-aged prostitute who propositions him. In her apartment, Cain humiliates her and threatens her with a knife before leaving.

Meanwhile, a group of eight young international female nursing students—Bridget, Christine, Leila, Jenny, Pam, Amy, Catherine, and Eileen—are preparing for their last week of exams before graduation. One afternoon, the women gather in the house they share to celebrate Eileen's birthday. Bridget, en route home from a shift at the hospital, witnesses a shooting in the streets that kills a man. Cain simultaneously stumbles upon the women's residence, entering through a door in the kitchen. He is met by Christine and Amy, who offer him food and a bottle of wine before sending him on his way. Pam subsequently leaves for her night shift at the hospital.

Later that evening, Christine, alone with Jenny, confesses that she has romantic feelings for her, while Christine attempts to calm Jenny, who is shaken by the death she witnessed earlier that day. Meanwhile, unbeknownst to the women, Cain returns to the house and breaks in through a downstairs window, confronting Jenny and Christine in the living room. Cain rounds the women up, as Amy attempts to negotiate with him, believing he wants to rob them. Holding them at knifepoint, he proceeds to bind their hands, promising them that he will let them free once Pam returns from her night shift. While doing so, he recounts anecdotes from his childhood, including his aunt telling him he was "born for hell" because he regularly missed Sunday church services; on his arm, Cain shows the women a tattoo he has of the phrase.

Cain brings Amy downstairs after leaving the six others bound in an upstairs bedroom. When he attempts to rape Amy, she fights back, leading him to strangle her to death with a belt. He then takes Jenny and Christine downstairs, strips them nude and attempts to force Jenny to perform oral sex on Christine. When she refuses, Cain beats her with a belt. Shortly after, Pam arrives at the house with her coworker Jill, only to find the lights disabled. In the darkness, Cain ambushes the women, stabbing Jill to death first before killing Pam. After turning the electricity back on, Cain returns upstairs and finds Eileen and Leila missing. He soon locates Eileen, who has hid in a closet, and stabs her to death. Leila, who has hidden under a bed, watches as Cain proceeds to murder Bridget. Catherine, now in a dissociative state, begins to laugh. Cain brings her downstairs, showing her the corpses of her friends before seating her at the kitchen table, feeding her a piece of Eileen's birthday cake. In her dissociated state, Catherine proceeds to take Cain's switchblade, and stabs herself in the chest, committing suicide. Cain returns upstairs, collapsing on the bed under which Leila is hiding, and falls asleep.

At dawn, Cain awakens, and leaves the house. Later that morning, he watches from a nearby pub as paramedics remove the bodies of the women from their house, and listens to locals discuss the murders. News broadcasts publicize the killer's distinctive tattoo, which Leila has described to authorities. Later, in a public bathroom, Cain attempts suicide by slashing one of his wrists. However, he is discovered by a civilian, and taken to a local hospital where a surgeon tends to his wound. Cain regains consciousness as the surgeon cleans his blood-covered arm, revealing the "born for hell" tattoo. The surgeon looks at him, and says, "So it was you."

Cast

Production
The film was shot on location in Dublin, with some second unit scenes shot in Belfast, Northern Ireland. Interiors were filmed in the then West Germany.  According to actor Mathieu Carrière, the film's producer and co-writer, Géza von Radványi, served a larger role in directing the film than its credited director, Denis Héroux, did.

Release
The film was released in Austin, Texas on 16 December 1976. It later screened in Edmonton, Alberta, Canada in April 1977.

Controversy
Upon its release in the United States, the film was met with criticism from feminist groups in Austin, Texas, who felt that it was exploitative in its graphic depictions of violence against women. The Austin Rape Crisis Center, the Coalition for Battered Women, the Women's Equity Action League, and Radical Lesbian Feminists were among the groups who held public protests at the film's local release in December 1976.

Home media
In 2007, Apprehensive Films released Born for Hell on DVD. Severin Films released the film on Blu-ray on 20 July 2021.

References

External links 

1970s exploitation films
1976 films
1976 horror films
Canadian films based on actual events
Canadian horror thriller films
1970s English-language films
English-language Canadian films
English-language French films
English-language German films
English-language Italian films
Films about The Troubles (Northern Ireland)
Films about veterans
Films directed by Denis Héroux
Films set in Northern Ireland
French films based on actual events
French horror thriller films
German films based on actual events
German horror thriller films
German serial killer films
Home invasions in film
Italian horror thriller films
Obscenity controversies in film
West German films
1970s Canadian films
1970s Italian films
1970s French films
1970s German films